Gibberula atlantidea is a species of sea snail, a marine gastropod mollusk, in the family Cystiscidae.

References

atlantidea
Gastropods described in 1956
Cystiscidae